Shelby County Schools may refer to:

Shelby County Schools (Alabama), Shelby County, Alabama
Shelby County Public Schools, Shelby County, Kentucky
Shelby County Schools (now Memphis-Shelby County Schools), Shelby County, Tennessee

See also
Shelby County (disambiguation)